= Western New York Irish Famine Memorial =

Coordinates: 42°52′50.2″N 78°53′5.3″W

- Interactive map of Western New York Irish Famine Memorial
- Location: Buffalo, New York City, U.S.
- Designer: Rob Ferguson
- Opening date: 1997
- Dedicated date: Victims of the Great famine

Flag of en:Buffalo, New York. SVG image created by uploader based on previous raster image and other images found on the web.

The Western New York Irish Famine Memorial is a memorial to The Great Famine. Situated on La Riviere Street along the waterfront in Buffalo, New York, it was dedicated in 1997. It was designed by Rob Ferguson and was erected by the Western New York Famine Commemoration Committee. The memorial consists of a central piece of granite. At its base there is an inscription of Luke 19:40 in Irish. The stone is situated in a well, meant to represent "The Great Silence," during which time very few people were willing to speak about the famine. Along its outer ring are 32 boulders, meant to represent the 32 counties of Ireland. There are also stones inscribed with the names of those who survived the Famine. Some stones are left blank, representing the unknown dead.
